The Braille pattern dots-345 is a 6-dot braille cell with the top and middle right and bottom left dots raised, or an 8-dot braille cell with the top and upper-middle right, and lower-middle left dots raised. It is represented by the Unicode code point U+281c, and in Braille ASCII with the greater than sign: >.

Unified Braille

In unified international braille, the braille pattern dots-345 is used to represent an unrounded open or near-open front vowel, such as /æ/ or /a/ when multiple letters correspond to these values, and is otherwise assigned as needed.

Table of unified braille values

Other braille

Plus dots 7 and 8

Related to Braille pattern dots-345 are Braille patterns 3457, 3458, and 34578, which are used in 8-dot braille systems, such as Gardner-Salinas and Luxembourgish Braille.

Related 8-dot kantenji patterns

In the Japanese kantenji braille, the standard 8-dot Braille patterns 567, 1567, 4567, and 14567 are the patterns related to Braille pattern dots-345, since the two additional dots of kantenji patterns 0345, 3457, and 03457 are placed above the base 6-dot cell, instead of below, as in standard 8-dot braille.

Kantenji using braille patterns 567, 1567, 4567, or 14567

This listing includes kantenji using Braille pattern dots-345 for all 6349 kanji found in JIS C 6226-1978.

  - 店

Variants and thematic compounds

  -  selector 1 + よ/广  =  矛
  -  selector 4 + よ/广  =  予
  -  selector 4 + selector 4 + よ/广  =  豫
  -  selector 6 + よ/广  =  疋
  -  よ/广 + selector 1  =  原
  -  よ/广 + selector 1 + selector 1  =  厂
  -  よ/广 + selector 3  =  广
  -  数 + よ/广  =  丗

Compounds of 店 and 广

  -  よ/广 + し/巿  =  府
  -  な/亻 + よ/广  =  俯
  -  よ/广 + ⺼  =  腐
  -  き/木 + よ/广 + し/巿  =  椨
  -  よ/广 + よ/广  =  序
  -  よ/广 + も/門  =  唐
  -  つ/土 + よ/广 + も/門  =  塘
  -  に/氵 + よ/广 + も/門  =  溏
  -  ゐ/幺 + よ/广  =  纏
  -  ゐ/幺 + ゐ/幺 + よ/广  =  纒
  -  ⺼ + よ/广  =  膺
  -  よ/广 + せ/食  =  席
  -  く/艹 + よ/广 + せ/食  =  蓆
  -  よ/广 + ろ/十  =  庁
  -  よ/广 + こ/子  =  広
  -  い/糹/#2 + よ/广 + こ/子  =  絋
  -  よ/广 + よ/广 + こ/子  =  廣
  -  つ/土 + よ/广 + こ/子  =  壙
  -  日 + よ/广 + こ/子  =  曠
  -  ま/石 + よ/广 + こ/子  =  礦
  -  よ/广 + 比  =  庇
  -  よ/广 + き/木  =  床
  -  よ/广 + き/木 + め/目  =  廂
  -  よ/广 + よ/广  =  序
  -  よ/广 + ん/止  =  底
  -  よ/广 + ゑ/訁  =  度
  -  か/金 + よ/广 + ゑ/訁  =  鍍
  -  よ/广 + な/亻  =  座
  -  く/艹 + よ/广 + な/亻  =  蓙
  -  よ/广 + む/車  =  庫
  -  よ/广 + へ/⺩  =  庭
  -  よ/广 + る/忄  =  庵
  -  よ/广 + と/戸  =  庶
  -  ひ/辶 + よ/广  =  遮
  -  心 + よ/广 + と/戸  =  蔗
  -  み/耳 + よ/广 + と/戸  =  蹠
  -  よ/广 + ゆ/彳  =  康
  -  る/忄 + よ/广 + ゆ/彳  =  慷
  -  の/禾 + よ/广 + ゆ/彳  =  糠
  -  せ/食 + よ/广 + ゆ/彳  =  鱇
  -  よ/广 + 囗  =  庸
  -  な/亻 + よ/广 + 囗  =  傭
  -  る/忄 + よ/广 + 囗  =  慵
  -  よ/广 + す/発  =  廃
  -  よ/广 + よ/广 + す/発  =  廢
  -  よ/广 + け/犬  =  廉
  -  に/氵 + よ/广 + け/犬  =  濂
  -  ち/竹 + よ/广 + け/犬  =  簾
  -  よ/广 + や/疒  =  廊
  -  よ/广 + 心  =  応
  -  よ/广 + よ/广 + 心  =  應
  -  み/耳 + よ/广 + 心  =  軈
  -  よ/广 + て/扌  =  摩
  -  よ/广 + ま/石  =  磨
  -  よ/广 + に/氵  =  魔
  -  selector 1 + よ/广 + ろ/十  =  廰
  -  よ/广 + よ/广 + ろ/十  =  廳
  -  よ/广 + も/門 + selector 2  =  庖
  -  よ/广 + 宿 + そ/馬  =  庠
  -  よ/广 + 宿 + ぬ/力  =  廁
  -  よ/广 + 宿 + す/発  =  廈
  -  よ/广 + 宿 + の/禾  =  廏
  -  よ/广 + や/疒 + 仁/亻  =  廐
  -  よ/广 + さ/阝 + こ/子  =  廓
  -  よ/广 + む/車 + selector 2  =  廖
  -  よ/广 + 宿 + と/戸  =  廚
  -  よ/广 + し/巿 + く/艹  =  廛
  -  よ/广 + 龸 + き/木  =  廝
  -  よ/广 + ろ/十 + ⺼  =  廟
  -  よ/广 + selector 6 + は/辶  =  廠
  -  よ/广 + む/車 + 火  =  廡
  -  よ/广 + 囗 + そ/馬  =  廨
  -  よ/广 + 囗 + れ/口  =  廩
  -  よ/广 + 宿 + た/⽥  =  廬
  -  よ/广 + 囗 + ひ/辶  =  廱
  -  よ/广 + よ/广 + ろ/十  =  廳
  -  日 + 宿 + よ/广  =  昿
  -  よ/广 + 宿 + せ/食  =  鷹

Compounds of 矛

  -  き/木 + よ/广  =  柔
  -  て/扌 + き/木 + よ/广  =  揉
  -  の/禾 + き/木 + よ/广  =  糅
  -  み/耳 + き/木 + よ/广  =  蹂
  -  と/戸 + き/木 + よ/广  =  鞣
  -  心 + よ/广  =  茅
  -  ち/竹 + よ/广  =  霧
  -  よ/广 + ぬ/力  =  務
  -  心 + selector 1 + よ/广  =  楙
  -  る/忄 + selector 1 + よ/广  =  懋
  -  ね/示 + selector 1 + よ/广  =  袤
  -  え/訁 + selector 1 + よ/广  =  譎
  -  心 + 宿 + よ/广  =  橘
  -  よ/广 + う/宀/#3 + せ/食  =  鶩
  -  よ/广 + せ/食 + selector 1  =  鷸

Compounds of 予 and 豫

  -  り/分 + よ/广  =  野
  -  つ/土 + り/分 + よ/广  =  墅
  -  お/頁 + よ/广  =  預
  -  心 + お/頁 + よ/广  =  蕷
  -  て/扌 + selector 4 + よ/广  =  抒
  -  き/木 + selector 4 + よ/广  =  杼
  -  り/分 + selector 4 + よ/广  =  舒

Compounds of 疋

  -  日 + よ/广  =  是
  -  て/扌 + よ/广  =  提
  -  つ/土 + よ/广  =  堤
  -  う/宀/#3 + 日 + よ/广  =  寔
  -  せ/食 + 日 + よ/广  =  醍
  -  ふ/女 + よ/广  =  婿
  -  う/宀/#3 + よ/广  =  定
  -  か/金 + よ/广  =  錠
  -  て/扌 + う/宀/#3 + よ/广  =  掟
  -  に/氵 + う/宀/#3 + よ/广  =  淀
  -  ま/石 + う/宀/#3 + よ/广  =  碇
  -  い/糹/#2 + う/宀/#3 + よ/广  =  綻
  -  み/耳 + う/宀/#3 + よ/广  =  聢
  -  え/訁 + う/宀/#3 + よ/广  =  諚
  -  ゆ/彳 + よ/广  =  従
  -  ゆ/彳 + ゆ/彳 + よ/广  =  從
  -  い/糹/#2 + よ/广  =  縦
  -  い/糹/#2 + い/糹/#2 + よ/广  =  縱
  -  る/忄 + ゆ/彳 + よ/广  =  慫
  -  心 + ゆ/彳 + よ/广  =  樅
  -  み/耳 + ゆ/彳 + よ/广  =  蹤
  -  ほ/方 + よ/广  =  旋
  -  や/疒 + よ/广  =  疑
  -  や/疒 + や/疒 + よ/广  =  嶷
  -  ま/石 + や/疒 + よ/广  =  礙
  -  よ/广 + 数  =  疎
  -  よ/广 + く/艹  =  疏
  -  心 + よ/广 + く/艹  =  蔬
  -  よ/广 + た/⽥  =  蛋
  -  ふ/女 + ふ/女 + よ/广  =  壻

Compounds of 原 and 厂

  -  る/忄 + よ/广 + selector 1  =  愿
  -  氷/氵 + よ/广  =  源
  -  よ/广 + お/頁  =  願
  -  仁/亻 + よ/广  =  仄
  -  日 + 仁/亻 + よ/广  =  昃
  -  よ/广 + さ/阝  =  厄
  -  て/扌 + よ/广 + さ/阝  =  扼
  -  む/車 + よ/广 + さ/阝  =  軛
  -  さ/阝 + よ/广 + さ/阝  =  阨
  -  よ/广 + 火  =  灰
  -  る/忄 + よ/广 + 火  =  恢
  -  え/訁 + よ/广 + 火  =  詼
  -  よ/广 + り/分  =  厘
  -  か/金 + よ/广 + り/分  =  甅
  -  ま/石 + よ/广 + り/分  =  竰
  -  き/木 + よ/广 + り/分  =  釐
  -  よ/广 + 日  =  厚
  -  よ/广 + ら/月  =  厭
  -  よ/广 + つ/土  =  圧
  -  よ/广 + よ/广 + つ/土  =  壓
  -  よ/广 + め/目  =  盾
  -  き/木 + よ/广 + め/目  =  楯
  -  よ/广 + を/貝  =  贋
  -  よ/广 + れ/口  =  后
  -  え/訁 + よ/广 + れ/口  =  詬
  -  ひ/辶 + よ/广 + れ/口  =  逅
  -  よ/广 + う/宀/#3  =  彦
  -  な/亻 + よ/广 + う/宀/#3  =  偐
  -  よ/广 + い/糹/#2  =  産
  -  さ/阝 + よ/广  =  薩
  -  よ/广 + 宿 + さ/阝  =  卮
  -  よ/广 + 宿 + う/宀/#3  =  厖
  -  よ/广 + を/貝 + ぬ/力  =  厠
  -  よ/广 + ん/止 + selector 1  =  厥
  -  よ/广 + お/頁 + す/発  =  厦
  -  よ/广 + selector 5 + と/戸  =  厨
  -  よ/广 + 宿 + 仁/亻  =  厩
  -  よ/广 + 宿 + き/木  =  厮
  -  よ/广 + 宿 + 氷/氵  =  厰
  -  つ/土 + 宿 + よ/广  =  壥
  -  よ/广 + 宿 + ひ/辶  =  巵
  -  よ/广 + よ/广 + き/木  =  牀
  -  や/疒 + 宿 + よ/广  =  癡
  -  よ/广 + り/分 + selector 1  =  矜
  -  ⺼ + 宿 + よ/广  =  胥
  -  む/車 + 宿 + よ/广  =  蠣
  -  み/耳 + 宿 + よ/广  =  躔
  -  み/耳 + 龸 + よ/广  =  軅
  -  よ/广 + め/目 + selector 4  =  靨
  -  よ/广 + お/頁 + に/氵  =  魘
  -  よ/广 + 龸 + せ/食  =  鴈

Compounds of 丗

  -  龸 + よ/广  =  棄
  -  龸 + 龸 + よ/广  =  弃
  -  ろ/十 + よ/广  =  世
  -  れ/口 + よ/广  =  喋
  -  く/艹 + よ/广  =  葉
  -  む/車 + よ/广  =  蝶
  -  え/訁 + よ/广  =  諜
  -  を/貝 + よ/广  =  貰
  -  に/氵 + ろ/十 + よ/广  =  泄
  -  心 + ろ/十 + よ/广  =  笹
  -  い/糹/#2 + ろ/十 + よ/广  =  紲
  -  き/木 + 宿 + よ/广  =  楪
  -  に/氵 + 宿 + よ/广  =  渫
  -  へ/⺩ + 宿 + よ/广  =  牒
  -  い/糹/#2 + 宿 + よ/广  =  緤
  -  せ/食 + 宿 + よ/广  =  鰈
  -  し/巿 + よ/广  =  帯
  -  に/氵 + よ/广  =  滞
  -  に/氵 + に/氵 + よ/广  =  滯
  -  し/巿 + し/巿 + よ/广  =  帶
  -  く/艹 + し/巿 + よ/广  =  蔕
  -  数 + 数 + よ/广  =  卅

Other compounds

  -  ま/石 + よ/广  =  碍
  -  ね/示 + よ/广  =  祥
  -  よ/广 + 氷/氵  =  厳
  -  よ/广 + よ/广 + 氷/氵  =  嚴
  -  な/亻 + よ/广 + 氷/氵  =  儼
  -  よ/广 + 仁/亻  =  坐
  -  て/扌 + よ/广 + 仁/亻  =  挫
  -  き/木 + よ/广 + ん/止  =  柢
  -  よ/广 + よ/广 + き/木  =  牀

Notes

Braille patterns